Parliamentary elections were held in the Grand Duchy of Finland on 1 and 2 July 1908.

Background
The Russian Tsar Nicholas II dissolved the first modern and democratic Finnish Parliament after its Speaker, Pehr Evind Svinhufvud, refused, in the Tsar's opinion, to show enough respect for him when speaking at the parliamentary session's opening. In 1908, the Russian government restarted its Russification policy in Finland, limiting Finnish self-government.

Campaign
Most Finns, including most Finnish parliamentarians, opposed the Russification, but disagreed on the means to effectively oppose it. The Social Democratic Party's supporters hoped for positive results from their party's work in Parliament, such as the growing prosperity of workers and tenant farmers, but would be disappointed during the next several elections. The other parliamentary parties, with the partial exception of the Agrarians, considered the Social Democrats' demands, such as an eight-hour workday, too radical to be implemented while Finland was trying to save its self-government.  Parliament had no official control over the government, which was responsible only to the Tsar and to the Governor-General. Parliament's legislative power was also limited by the Tsar's ability to veto its laws, without a time limit on his consideration whether to veto the laws or not.

Results

References

General elections in Finland
Finland
Parliament
Finland
Election and referendum articles with incomplete results